Bethel Township is one of twenty townships in Fayette County, Iowa, USA.  As of the 2000 census, its population was 297.

Geography
According to the United States Census Bureau, Bethel Township covers an area of 36.12 square miles (93.54 square kilometers); of this, 36.09 square miles (93.46 square kilometers, 99.91 percent) is land and 0.03 square miles (0.08 square kilometers, 0.09 percent) is water.

Unincorporated towns
 Richfield at 
(This list is based on USGS data and may include former settlements.)

Adjacent townships
 Eden Township (north)
 Auburn Township (northeast)
 Windsor Township (east)
 Center Township (southeast)
 Banks Township (south)
 Sumner No. 2 Township, Bremer County (southwest)
 Fredericksburg Township, Chickasaw County (west)
 Stapleton Township, Chickasaw County (northwest)

Cemeteries
The township contains these three cemeteries: Bethel, Pitts and Richfield.

Major highways
  U.S. Route 18
  Iowa Highway 193

School districts
 North Fayette Valley Community School District
 Sumner-Fredericksburg Community School District

Political districts
 Iowa's 1st congressional district
 State House District 18
 State Senate District 9

References
 United States Census Bureau 2008 TIGER/Line Shapefiles
 United States Board on Geographic Names (GNIS)
 United States National Atlas

External links
 US-Counties.com
 City-Data.com

Townships in Fayette County, Iowa
Townships in Iowa